Ganlu Temple, may refer to:

 Ganlu Temple (Mount Jiuhua), on Mount Jiuhua, in Qingyang County, Anhui, China
 Ganlu Temple (Zhenjiang), in Zhenjiang, Jiangsu, China
 Ganlu Temple (Wuxi), in Wuxi, Jiangsu, China